The house of Murashu were a family discovered in archaeological findings dating to the late 19th century. The family were alive during the fifth century BC in Nippur, participating in early economic activities.

Family name
Both Murašû and Murashu mean wild cat.  The words are transliterated from mu-ra-šu-ú, as originally written in syllabic cuneiform script.  The house is named after the head of the family.

Evidence of archaeology
A large proportion of archaeological evidence on the family is from a house in Nippur, found within the remains of a twenty by ten foot room of the building.  It was initially found during 1893 within the third expedition of the University of Pennsylvania at the site, at the time directed by John Henry Haynes.  Known as the Murashu archive, these consist of clay tablets, 879 in total (numbering 879 during 2005 Provan, Long, Longman; 835 during 2001 Greenfield, Paul, Stone, Pinnick; 800 during 1999 Mieroop; and 650 during 1995 in Schramm) written in the languages Aramaic and Akkadian.  The archive includes 657 different seal types (Bregstein).

Murashu tablets 
The Murashu tablets provide a glimpse into what life was like for fifth-century Jewish descendants of the Babylonian Exile and captivity. After the Persian king Cyrus the Great captured Babylon in 539 BCE, he allowed and helped finance the return of Jews to Judea with the Edict of Cyrus in 538. The Murashu tablets are dated to this period after Jews were allowed to return to Judea. The fact that the banking house "Murashu & Sons" conducted business with Jews who decided to remain in Nippur rather than return to Judea suggests that life in Persian-controlled Nippur was at least somewhat tolerable for Jews.

The tablets discuss one such Jew, Udarna, son of Rahim-ili. Some of Udarna's property was stolen by his brother and nephew. To see that he might reacquire his property, Udarna brought his complaint to Bel-nadin-shumu, one of the sons of "Murashu & Sons." Udarna did have his property returned. In addition, no charges were brought against his brother or nephew. They also agreed that no offspring of Udarna would ever bring charges against Udarna's brother or nephew or their offspring. This act of forbidding any suit being brought against Udarna's brother and nephew or the generations after, was seemingly implemented to prevent a blood feud that might last generations.

Notably the Hebrew names contained within the tablets which begin with יהו (Yod Heh Waw) are all written “Yahu-” and never “Yeho”. This evidence from the Murashu documents thus corresponds to that from other sources: after the Exile the ordinary form of the divine name used as an initial theophorous element was yahu.

Banking
HV Hilprecht considers the group ("firm") to be bankers and brokers, who were engaged in money-lending and trading operations in southern and central Babylonia for a period of 50 years from the end of the 5th century (Dandamaev, Lukonin, Kohl).

Three generations of the family are attested to in the Nippur documents. The archives ("legal" documentation) include matters concerning the less wealthy of Nippur living in the outer areas of the city, although also the interests of both royalty (the renting of fields - Dandamaev, Lukonin, Kohl) and those associated with these, participating as officials within their estate.  The artifacts are dated to the time of the reign of the kings Artaxerxes I and Darius II, (otherwise dated 465, 464 or 455 to 404 or 403 BCE).

The core activity of the family was fief and estate land management, with members primarily active as creditors for workers of agricultural enterprises, in the lending and provision of equipment, seed, tools, irrigation and animals for this purpose, to individuals including Jews, these relevant as to the book of Ezekiel.  The archive gives information on interaction and agreement and the like with 100 Jewish families.  The family employed more than 60 agents.  The house leased plots of land owned by civil servants (23 high court officials) and warriors (bow-lands, horse-lands and chariot lands) transferring rental payments and also subsequent taxes to the royal family. The government used the family for the purposes of the collection of tax on land (harāka [OP]) (the family "farmed out" taxes). The family had dealings with 2500 separate individuals, at least as evidenced by the archive document when Schniedewind states this includes in total an "...onomasticon of some 2500 names...".

The family had no role in foreign exchange (international trade).  Although members did travel to Susa (in Elam, about 200 kilometres distance) where they remained for months involved in financial businesses.

References

Original sources
JA Thompson - The Bible and archaeology Paternoster Press, 1973 Retrieved 2012-07-10
S Moshenskyi -  History of the Weksel Sergei Moshenskyi, 1 Aug 2008 Retrieved 2012-07-10 
KR Nemet-Nejat - Daily Life in Ancient Mesopotamia Greenwood Publishing Group, 1998 Retrieved 2012-07-10 

secondary 
JJ Collins, PW Flint - The Book of Daniel: Composition and Reception, Volume 1 BRILL, 2001 Retrieved 2012-07-28 
M.Dandameyev - [L Finkelstein, WD Davies eds.]- The Cambridge History of Judaism: Introduction; The Persian period Cambridge University Press, 16 Feb 1984 Retrieved 2012-07-28

External links
AT Clay [Hilprecht, H Vollrat, 1859-1925 ed.] Business Documents of Murashu and Sons of Nippur (The Babylonian expedition of the University of Pennsylvania. Series A, Cuneiform texts 1893)  Retrieved 2012-07-29 (website provides information on the activities of Bêl-nâdin-shuma and Rîmît-Ninib - both sons of Murashu)
LB Bregstein and TJ Schneider Bibliography Retrieved 2012-07-30

History of banking
Sumer